Mullaghanish is a 649 m high mountain in the Derrynasaggart range, located just northeast of Ballyvourney in County Cork, Ireland.

Transmission site
This site is home to one of Telefís Éireann's original five main television transmitters. Coming on air in December 1962, initially on low power, it was in full operation by September 1963 with a 625-line VHF service for the Southwest of Ireland, namely counties Cork, Kerry and Limerick. Today it is owned and operated by 2RN a subsidiary of RTÉ. In 2009 in preparation for the transmission of digital terrestrial television (DTT), a new mast was erected at Mullaghanish with a height of 225m, making it the tallest television transmitter in Ireland, the original 170m mast was subsequently removed. Analogue television transmissions from this site ended on 24 October 2012, and the national DTT service, Saorview, is now broadcast from Mullaghanish at an ERP of 200 kW, making this the most powerful television transmitter in all of Ireland, a distinction formerly attributed to the Cairn Hill (analogue) transmitter in County Longford.

As well as digital television, six national FM radio services are broadcast from the site, all using vertical polarisation. Local station, Radio Kerry, is broadcast from a directional antenna pointing west, into its target service area of County Kerry, and Newstalk is broadcast in mono.

The Mullaghanish transmitter has the highest number of relays (20) of any television transmitter in Ireland reflecting the difficult topography of its service area.

Current transmissions

Digital television

Analogue FM radio

List of Mullaghanish DTT relay transmitters

Gallery

References

Radio masts and towers in Europe
Marilyns of Ireland
Hewitts of Ireland
Mountains and hills of County Kerry
Mountains and hills of County Cork
Radio in Ireland
Mass media in the Republic of Ireland
Transmitter sites in Ireland
Mountains under 1000 metres